William Alexander Hullett (19 December 1915 - 1982) was a professional footballer who played in the Football League for New Brighton, Plymouth Argyle, Cardiff City and Nottingham Forest.

References

1915 births
1982 deaths
English footballers
Footballers from Liverpool
Association football forwards
Everton F.C. players
New Brighton A.F.C. players
Plymouth Argyle F.C. players
Manchester United F.C. players
Merthyr Tydfil F.C. players
Cardiff City F.C. players
Nottingham Forest F.C. players
Worcester City F.C. players
English Football League players